Staples High School may refer to the following schools:

Staples High School (Connecticut), a high school in Connecticut, United States
Staples-Motley High School, a high school in Minnesota, United States, see List of Minnesota State High School League Conferences